Capitol Broadcasting Center is a Philippine radio network. Its corporate office is located at Unit 1802, 18/F, OMM-Citra Building, San Miguel Avenue, Ortigas Center, Pasig City.

CBC Stations
Source:

AM Stations

FM Stations
Like Radio

Radyo Agong
The following stations are operated by RSV Broadcasting Services.

Other Brands

Former Stations

References

Radio stations in the Philippines
Philippine radio networks